Quercus petelotii is the accepted name of an endemic oak tree species in the beech family Fagaceae; there are no known sub-species. It is placed in subgenus Cerris, section Cyclobalanopsis.

The species appears to be endemic to Vietnam, where it may be called sồi Petelot.  The tree grows up to 20 m and has 20 mm acorns, produced from velvety cupules.

References

External links
 

petelotii
Endemic flora of Vietnam
Flora of Indo-China
Trees of Vietnam
Taxa named by Aimée Antoinette Camus